A poor season found the 1923 Brooklyn Robins in sixth place once more.

Offseason 
 January 2, 1923: Turner Barber was purchased by the Robins from the Chicago Cubs.
 February 11, 1923: Clarence Mitchell was traded by the Robins to the Philadelphia Phillies for George Smith.
 February 15, 1923: Hy Myers and Ray Schmandt were traded by the Robins to the St. Louis Cardinals for Jack Fournier.

Regular season

Season standings

Record vs. opponents

Roster

Notable transactions 
 May 17, 1923: Dutch Schliebner was traded by the Robins to the St. Louis Browns for Dutch Henry and cash.

Player stats

Batting

Starters by position and other batters 
Pitchers batting stats included.

Note: Pos = Position; G = Games played; AB = At bats; H = Hits; Avg. = Batting average; HR = Home runs; RBI = Runs batted in

Pitching

Starting pitchers 
Note: G = Games pitched; IP = Innings pitched; W = Wins; L = Losses; ERA = Earned run average; SO = Strikeouts

Other pitchers 
Note: G = Games pitched; IP = Innings pitched; W = Wins; L = Losses; ERA = Earned run average; SO = Strikeouts

Relief pitchers 
Note: G = Games pitched; W = Wins; L = Losses; SV = Saves; ERA = Earned run average; SO = Strikeouts

References

External links
Baseball-Reference season page
Baseball Almanac season page
1923 Brooklyn Robins uniform
Brooklyn Dodgers reference site
Acme Dodgers page 
Retrosheet

Los Angeles Dodgers seasons
Brooklyn Robins season
Brooklyn 
1920s in Brooklyn
Flatbush, Brooklyn